The Reese Creek School in Gallatin County, Montana, northeast of Belgrade, Montana, is a one-room schoolhouse which was built in 1906.  It was listed on the National Register of Historic Places in 1981.

It is a balloon-framed one-room schoolhouse building with a recessed entrance and a large cupola.

It is located on Springhill Road.

References

One-room schoolhouses in Montana
School buildings on the National Register of Historic Places in Montana
National Register of Historic Places in Gallatin County, Montana
School buildings completed in 1906
1906 establishments in Montana
Schools in Gallatin County, Montana